SYSTRA is a multinational engineering and consulting group in the mobility sector, whose fields of activity include rail and public transport. In 2019, it employed a staff of about 7,300 people, and is a limited company which shareholders include French national railway company SNCF, RATP, and various banks.

History

The origins : French engineering 
The history of SYSTRA begins in 1957, when the SNCF created SOFRERAIL (French Company for Railway Design and Construction). Four years later, the RATP also creates its own engineering branch : SOFRETU (French Company for Public Transport Design and Construction). SOFRERAIL and SOFRETU merge in 1995, originally under the name SYSTRA-Sofretu-Sofrerail, later shortened to SYSTRA in 1997.

In June 2011, INEXIA (engineering branch of the SNCF) and XELIS (the 2006 launched engineering branch of the RATP) both join SYSTRA. The merger is finally ratified on 1 July 2012.

International acquisitions and development 
Created as an international company, SYSTRA quickly develops a network of branches and subsidiaries in more than 50 countries. In 1995, the acquisition of the MVA group gives SYSTRA a consulting base in Hong-Kong and the MiddleEast. In 1990 the CANARAIL subsidiary is created in Montreal (now known as SYSTRA Canada), and in 1994 the US branch opens in New York City under the name of SYSTRA Consulting. In 2006, after 50 years of presence in India, the SYSTRA India subsidiary is created in Delhi, and further developed with the acquisition of the Indian engineering office SAI. In 2015, SYSTRA buys JMP Consultants Ltd, a British company that specializes in engineering and transport planning consulting. That very same year, SYSTRA buys Tectran, thus strengthening its Brazilian implantation.

In 2016, SYSTRA acquires 4 new subsidiaries: Dalco Elteknik AB (a Swedish rail engineering company), Scott Lister (an Australian company specialized in system engineering and risk management), SIAS Transport Planners (A British company specialized in transport planning consulting) and VETEC (a Brazilian road and rail transport engineering and consulting company).

In 2017, the group strengthens its "bridges and civil engineering structures" department by acquiring the California-based company International Bridge Technologies. Its Brazilian subsidiaries Tectran and VETEC merge at the end of that very same year.

In 2018, the historical Canadian branch, CANARAIL, changes its name to SYSTRA Canada.

Innovation 
SYSTRA has been a partner of the French national research program Ville10D since 2012. The program consistently promotes the exploitation of urban underground spaces via the design of sustainable metropolises. With about 30 partners (engineers, project managers, research labs, companies and NGOs), the program hopes to improve knowledge of underground resources and to show there is a realistic alternative to laying out the surface only. This initiative of the French Association for Tunnels and Underground Space (AFTES) is supported by the French Minister for Ecological Transition.

SYSTRA's teams also work towards developing autonomous trains together with the SNCF. The aim is to create a system that perceives its surroundings in a way that imitates the observation powers of train drivers. Since 2015, the group has worked with several partners on European wide research and innovation projects, including IN2RAIL, SHIFT2RAIL and CAPACITY4RAIL. These projects intend to optimize the conception of key elements in the infrastructure (tracks, tracks appliances), to develop predictive maintenance and to envisage future rail management systems.

Since 2016, the firm has been part of the consultative technological committee of Virgin Hyperloop One, a company developing the high speed transportation technology "Hyperloop". In January 2017, the Californian company asked SYSTRA to assess the safety of the Hyperloop infrastructures in order to obtain the legal validation of the project. The first two tests are successfully conducted that very same year. The group is awarded the BIM prize for "Build Earth Live Hyperloop", in Dubai during the "Hyperloop Station Design Competition", for its Möbius project. The 2-day challenge consisted in using a collaborative BIM platform to conceive a prototype that would bring the 2h30 train ride between Dubai and the Fujairah Emirate to about 10 minutes.

In Singapore, SYSTRA supports the ASV project (Automated Driving Simulation and Validation) in partnership with the Institute of Technological Research SystemX, the NTU (Nanyang Technological University), Renault, SNCF, and AV Simulation (an OKTAL subsidiary). The project is one of the strategic lines of the CETRAN (Center of Excellence for Testing and Research of Autonomous Vehicles), centered on the development of a digital simulation platform to test out and certify the safety of autonomous vehicles in urban and suburban environments. For 48 months, autonomous vehicles are tried and tested on a 2ha trial ground that reproduces Singapore's main roads.

In 2012, SYSTRA creates the workshop " La Fabrique " that uses a "makerstorming" fast-track method of innovation invented by the Nod-A agency. The workshop brings together employees and outside speakers in a cross-disciplinary approach in order to reflect upon practical problems and come up with answers. In 2016, " La Fabrique " is awarded the Label 2017 of the L'Observeur du Design.

Organization 
The company works together with industrial groups or equipment companies. It acts as a consultant in the public transportation sector, or as a provider of operation services for managing companies. As such, SYSTRA works equally as a subcontractor for private clients and public clients.

SYSTRA segments its activity by expertise but also by sector.

Buses and Bus rapid transit
Light rail Transit
Metros
Rail
High Speed Rail
Urban cable cars
Stations
Bridges
 Underground structures
Roads and highways
Aviation

Significant projects

Tram 
SYSTRA was involved in the design of over 60% of working tram lines in France. In 1997, SYSTRA partnered with the engineering group TYSIA to design Bordeaux's tram, the first one to go without overhead lines. Brest's and Casablanca's tram lines, which SYSTRA designed were named second best in the world by the British Light Rail Transit Association in 2012. SYSTRA is also responsible for the project management of the Dubai tram, opened in 2014. The group had been active in the capital since 2003 when it was charged with conducting preliminary studies for the underground. In 2018, SYSTRA Canada was asked to engineer Quebec city's tram.

Metro 
SYSTRA was involved in one in two underground projects across the world, whether as a designer or an engineer, to conduct studies or to assist the project management. The company has contributed to the following notable projects :

Santiago Metro
Dubaï Metro : SYSTRA conducted the preliminary studies from the outset of the project in 2003 and later designed the entire system.
Mexico City Metro : SYSTRA was mandated as a technical assistant for the construction of the B line, that completes the existing network in Mexico.
Mecca Metro : SYSTRA designed this line, designed to ease pilgrims transport.
Baku Metro : SYSTRA engineered the project and directed the studies from 2009 to 2014.
Cairo Metro : since 1970, SYSTRA has signed 20 contracts with the National Tunnel Authority, including preliminary studies, conception, work supervision, and maintenance of three of the metro lines.
Algiers Metro : SYSTRA managed the construction work and put into service the Integral System (IS).
Grand Paris Express : SYSTRA has been involved in the preliminary studies of the new metro since 2011, and later joined in other structuring projects : 
 Assisting system project management, wheeled equipment management and automated driving for lines 15, 16 and 17.
 Project management on Vitry-sur-Seine maintenance site.
 Infrastructure project management on the first section of the line 15 South, between Noisy-Champs and Villejuif Louis Aragon and infrastructure project management on line 15 West together with SETEC.
New York City Subway : SYSTRA acted as a project manager for the East Side Access, a tunnel built under the East River. They handled the budget, planning, design and construction monitoring.
Lyon Metro SYSTRA has been working on Lyon Metro for about a dozen years, most recently undertaking the modernization and automatization of lines B and D.
Toulouse Metro : SYSTRA conducted the preliminary studies of the A and B lines, and is engineering the central section of the C line.
Brussels Metro : SYSTRA is in charge of the automatization of the two main lines of the network (lines 1 and 5)
Copenhagen Metro : SYSTRA handled civil engineering work and project management for the Cityringen metro line.
Crossrail project : SYSTRA has been chosen as a partner to manage the underground section under central London.
Nagpur Metro : SYSTRA worked as a consultant and engineer on the creation of the first two metro lines of the city.  
Mumbai Metro : SYSTRA was appointed as a consultant on the lines 1 and 4 of Mumbai metro.
Chennai Metro : SYSTRA was appointed as a consultant for the Phase 1 and 2 of Chennai metro.
Surat Metro : Systra secures India’s Surat Metro Rail Project Phase I contract.

Rail 
 Denmark Electrification program: this program covers a network spanning 10.000 km and was implemented in 2017. SYSTRA has fulfilled consulting assignments for Banedanmark, which manages the network.
 North South freight and passengers line (Saudi Arabia): SYSTRA fulfills consulting assignments for the study, the management and the supervision of construction work. The line is over 1.400 km long, its freight axis was put in service in 2017 and its passenger line in 2018.
 Brest-Quimper line: the project manager entrusted SYSTRA with the revamping works and the line re-opened towards the end of 2017,  increasing its offer by 50%. 
 Belfort-Delle line: SYSTRA has been conducting the preliminary studies and supervised the work which began in 2011. Closed since 1992, the line was re-opened towards the end of 2018 and is now one of the main Franco-Swiss links.
 Trans-Gabon freight line: SYSTRA conducted the preliminary studies and designs this 650 km long line.
 Dakar Regional Express Train: the size of this project, the speed at which it was completed and the technical and socio-economic stakes make it most unusual. SYSTRA assisted the project management from 2015 until the inauguration at the beginning of 2019.
 In Southern California, SYSTRA was selected to rebuild 121 double deck coaches used by Metrolink (commuter operator in Southern California.

High Speed Lines 
 HSL South Europe Atlantic : SYSTRA is the engineer of choice of the COSEA group. SYSTRA owns 30% of the maintenance company MESEA, together with VINCI until 2054.
 2nd phase of the Eastern European HSL : SYSTRA conducts consulting assignments for the study, the project management and the supervision of the work. During the dynamic trial tests for the legal ratification of the line on 14 November 2015, the test train derails. The company, the SNCF and three physical persons are placed under formal investigation on 19 December 2017. The judicial procedure is ongoing.
Since 2018, SYSTRA has been helping the SNCF to implement the new Provence-Côte d'Azur line (LNPCA) in France.
High Speed 1 (UK), Channel Tunnel : SYSTRA conducted consulting works for the study, project management, works supervision and opening of the tunnel.
 Seoul-Busan High Speed Rail (Korea) : SYSTRA conducted consulting works for the study, project management, work supervision and opened the line.
 In Morocco, SYSTRA participated in the first African HSL project together with the SNCF and other French companies. The line was commissioned in November 2018.
 Nîmes-Montpellier bypass : it is the first HSL dedicated to freight and passengers alike in France. SYSTRA designed and constructed the line and managed the project and the trial tests. The freight services started towards the end of 2017 and the passenger services in mid-2018.

Urban cable cars 
SYSTRA is involved in defining, designing and integrating cable transport projects in urban settings. The company has for instance been chosen to design, implement and maintain the Orleans cable car, and in 2018 won the contract for Marseille's cable car project. SYSTRA is also designed Toulouse.'s cable car, the second urban cable car project in France after that of Brest (opened in 2016), and the second longest.

Bridges 
In 2014, SYSTRA is asked to conduct studies for the Chacao bridge, meant to link the Chilean island of Chiloe to the continent. It is the biggest suspension bridge project in South America. Located near a seismic fault, the project is a technological challenge. The construction was approved in February 2019.

On 1 May 2019, SYSTRA inaugurated the Sheikh Jaber Al-Ahmad Al-Saba bridge in Kuwait.

In 2017, SYSTRA acquired International Bridge Technologies, a prominent bridge engineering company. On that occasion, the group announced that it was launching a worldwide expert network on the subject.

In 2018, SYSTRA was selected by the city of Kingston, Canada to design and build a 1.2 km bridge over the Cataraqui river. Construction is meant to start in 2019.

Underground structures 
SYSTRA is involved in several tunnels and underground works. Most notably, SYSTRA is in charge of a section of the Lyon-Turin Euralpin Tunnel (TELT), one of the biggest railway projects in Europe.

On 5 October 2021, SYSTRA acquired SWS, a leading Italian engineering company recognised worldwide for its expertise in the field of tunnels and underground structures making it SYSTRA SWS. The acquisition enabled SYSTRA to strengthen its expertise in this field, increase its presence in Italy and access new markets in the design and construction of tunnels, particularly in Europe.

Results and economic context 
In 2018, the specialized review Engineering News-Record ranked SYSTRA 5th among the international engineering companies specialized in "Mass Transit and Rail". It was also ranked 8th for bridges and 9th for transports, based on the 2017 turnover.

The group relies on the historical expertise of the SNCF and RATP.

SYSTRA is present on every continent, in 80 countries in total. The company divides its activity between 7 regions, relying on its local subsidiaries. In 2017, SYSTRA was involved in 60% of the world's automated metro line projects. International revenue is growing, from 55% in 2015 to two-thirds in 2018.

Awards
 Structural Awards 2008 presented to the St. Pancras International Station High Speed 1 project. The prize awarded to the RLE consortium (Arup, Bechtel, Halcrow, SYSTRA) for the structural design of the buildings.
 Grand Prix National for engineering, awarded in 2008 by SYNTEC Ingénierie to Daniel DUTOIT (SYSTRA) for overall design and project management of the Dubai metro.
 Safety Award 2010 (RTA – Roads and Transport Authority, Dubai): Prize awarded to SYSTRA – PARSONS for maintaining high standards of health, safety and environment.  
 MEED transport project of the year (2011) awarded to SYSTRA & Parsons for the Dubai metro red line
 Centenary award awarded in 2013 by FIDIC for the Makkah – Mashaaer metro.

References

{{|url=https://www.systra.com/wp-content/uploads/2021/10/20211005_systra-sws_press-release.pdf}}
Engineering companies of France
Companies based in Paris
Public transport